Mal-e Gol (also Romanized as Malegol; also known as Mal-e Ashk) is a village in Markazi Rural District, in the Central District of Dashti County, Bushehr Province, Iran. At the 2006 census, its population was 308, in 68 families.

References 

Populated places in Dashti County